Joseph Kerwin is a Republican member of the Pennsylvania House of Representatives for the 125th legislative district. He was first elected in 2020.

Kerwin currently sits on the  Agriculture & Rural Affairs, Game & Fisheries, Gaming Oversight, and Liquor Control committees.

References

External links

Living people
1993 births
21st-century American politicians
Republican Party members of the Pennsylvania House of Representatives
People from Dauphin County, Pennsylvania
Pennsylvania State University alumni